Senator Alston may refer to:

Lela Alston (born 1942), Arizona State Senate 
William J. Alston (1800–1876), Alabama State Senate
Willis Alston (1769–1837), North Carolina State Senate